The National Translation Award is awarded annually by the American Literary Translators Association for literary translators who have made an outstanding contribution to literature in English by masterfully recreating the artistic force of a book of consummate quality. Since 2015 the prize has been awarded separately in categories of prose and poetry. Established in 1998, the NTA is the only prize for a work of literary translation into English to include an evaluation of the source language text. As of 2019 the award is worth $2,500 given to the translator. The award is usually given to translations of previously untranslated contemporary works or first-time translations of older works, but important re-translations have also been honored. The winning translators and books are featured at the annual conference of the American Literary Translators Association.

The ALTA also awards the Lucien Stryk Asian Translation Prize, Italian Prose in Translation Award, and the ALTA Travel Fellowships.

Winners

National Translation Award 2007-2014

National Translation Award 2015-Current

2015 marked the first year in which two separate National Translation Awards were given, one for poetry and one for prose.

Lucien Styrk Asian Translation Prize

Since 2009 the Lucien Stryk Asian Translation Prize is awarded at the same time as the NTA by the ALTA and recognizes the best translation into English of book-length Asian works. It is named for Lucien Stryk, an American Zen poet and translator. The winning translator is award $6,000.

Italian Prose in Translation Award

Since 2015 the Italian Prose in Translation Award (IPTA) recognizes the importance of contemporary Italian prose (fiction and literary non-fiction) and promotes the translation of Italian works into English. This $5,000 prize will be awarded annually to a translator of a recent work of Italian prose (fiction or literary non-fiction).

References

External links
The National Translation Award

Translation awards
American literary awards
Awards established in 1998